Emil Karl Henry Kåberg (born February 2, 1978, in Hallsberg) is a Swedish former professional ice hockey player.

Kåberg is known for his physical game of playing and he was forming, together with his old linemate in Färjestad Per Ledin, a duo called the Bruise Brothers.

Kåberg played for the Allsvenskan club IFK Kumla from 1994 to 1995 and from 1996 to 2001. During the 1995/96 season and parts of the 1996–97 season Kåberg played for Frölunda HCs juniorteam, but he returned to Kumla in 1996. In the summer of 2001 he signed with Bofors IK, also an Allsvenskan club. He played with them for two and half seasons and became "the most hated player in Allsvenskan" . In January 2004 he was transferred to the Elitserien club Färjestads BK. In his first full season with Färjestad, 2004/05, he set the record for most penalty minutes in one season (regular season) in Elitserien with 203 PIM. In April 2006 he won his first Swedish Championship. On April 29, 2014, Kåberg officially announced his retirement as a player.

Career statistics

Statistics as of April 18, 2006.

External links

Kåberg retires (Swedish)

1978 births
Bofors IK players
Färjestad BK players
Frölunda HC players
Living people
Örebro HK players
People from Hallsberg Municipality
Swedish ice hockey players
Sportspeople from Örebro County